Navy Yard may refer to:

 Boston Navy Yard, Massachusetts
 Brooklyn Navy Yard, the New York Naval Shipyard
 Cavite Navy Yard, located in Manila Bay, the Philippines
 Charleston Navy Yard, South Carolina
 Mare Island Naval Shipyard, California
 Norfolk Naval Shipyard, Virginia
 Philadelphia Naval Shipyard, Pennsylvania
 Portsmouth Naval Shipyard, Maine
 Puget Sound Naval Shipyard, Washington state
 San Francisco Naval Shipyard, California
 Washington Navy Yard, Washington, D.C.
 Navy Yard–Ballpark station, a Metro station in Washington, D.C.
 Navy Yard, Washington, D.C., the neighborhood around the Washington Navy Yard and served by the Metro station of the same name